The Chief Nursing Officer (CNO) is the most senior advisor on nursing matters in a government. There are CNOs in the United Kingdom who are appointed to advise their respective governments: His Majesty's Government, the Northern Ireland Executive, the Scottish Government, and the Welsh Government. Each CNO is assisted by one or more Deputy Chief Nursing Officers, and are complemented by a Chief Medical Officer.

Chief Nursing Officers for England
The Chief Nursing Officer is based at the Department of Health (and its predecessors).

 1941 to 1948: Dame Katherine Watt
 1948 to 1958: Dame Elizabeth Cockayne
 1958 to 1972: Dame Kathleen Raven
 1972 to 1982: Dame Phyllis Friend
 1982 to 1992: Dame Anne Poole
 1992 to 1999: Dame Yvonne Moores
 1999 to 2004: Dame Sarah Mullally
 2004 to 2012: Dame Christine Beasley
 2012 to 2019: Jane Cummings
 2019 to present: Dame Ruth May

Chief Nursing Officers for Scotland

The Chief Nursing Officers for Scotland is based at the Scottish Government and previously at the Scottish Office.
 1939 to 1944: Margaret Colville Marshall (later OBE, ARRC).
1944 to 1961: Mary Olivia Robinson, CBE.
1961 to 1969: Margaret Macnaughton, OBE.
 1970 to 1976: Dame Muriel Powell 
 1977 to 1988: Margaret Gibson Auld
 1988 to 1992: Dame Yvonne Moores
 1992 to 2004: Anne Jarvie
 2004 to 2009: Paul Martin
 2010 to 2014: Rosalyn Elaine Moore
 2015 to 2020: Fiona McQueen
 2020 onwards: Prof Amanda Croft

Chief Nursing Officers for Wales

 1972 to 1981: Edith Alice Bell
 1982 to 1988: Dame Yvonne Moores
 1999 to 2010: Rosemary Kennedy
 2010 to 2021: Jean White
 2021 to 2021: Gareth Howells (interim)
 2021 to present: Sue Tranka

Chief Nursing Officers for Northern Ireland

The Chief Nursing Officer for Northern Ireland is based at the Department of Health (Northern Ireland) (and its processors).

 1960 to 1975: Mona Grey
 1995 to 2005: Judith Hill
 2005 to 2011: Martin Bradley
 2013 to present: Charlotte McArdle

References

British nursing administrators
United Kingdom
Government occupations
Government of Northern Ireland
Government of Scotland
Government of Wales
Nursing in the United Kingdom
Civil Service (United Kingdom)
Administrators in the National Health Service